BMAS may stand for:

 Bank Maspion, Indonesian banking and financial services public company
 British Medical Acupuncture Society
 British Military Administration (Somali)
 Bundesministerium für Arbeit und Soziales, German Federal Ministry of Labour and Social Affairs

See also
 BMA (disambiguation)